The Third Floor, Inc. (aka TTF) is an American previsualization, postvisualization, and virtual reality company based in Los Angeles. It was founded by a group of artists that had worked together on Star Wars: Episode III – Revenge of the Sith at Lucasfilm, and named the company after the location where they worked. The company has primarily focused on the previsualization aspect of film, television, game and themed attraction production; but as of the mid-2010s has been developing and applying an expertise in virtual production to support visualization, motion capture, camera layout and shooting on set.

Film and Television 
 RRR
 Shang-Chi and the Legend of the Ten Rings
 Godzilla vs. Kong
 Terminator: Dark Fate
 Chaos Walking
 Wonder Woman 1984
 Infinite
 The Tomorrow War
 Dolittle
 Black Widow
 Jungle Cruise
 Men in Black: International
 Red Notice
 Captain Marvel
 Gemini Man
 Godzilla: King of the Monsters
 Detective Pikachu
 Bumblebee
 Venom
 Avengers: Infinity War
 Star Wars: The Last Jedi
 Thor: Ragnarok
 Game of Thrones
 Spider-Man: Homecoming
 Beauty and The Beast
 Wonder Woman
 Black Sails
 Rogue One: A Star Wars Story
 The Jungle Book
 Fantastic Beasts and Where to Find Them
 Kong: Skull Island
 Mad Max: Fury Road
 Into the Storm
 Gravity
 2.0

Games 

 Destiny 2
 Gears of War 4
 Doom
 Lords of the Fallen
 Resident Evil 6

Theme Attractions 

 Race Through New York Starring Jimmy Fallon
 Harry Potter and the Escape from Gringotts
 Skull Island: Reign of Kong
 Fast & Furious: Supercharged
 Minion Mayhem

Awards

References

External links
 IMDB page
 The Third Floor, Inc.

Computer animation
Visual effects companies
Entertainment companies established in 2004
Film production companies of the United States
Film production companies of the United Kingdom